The following page is a list of shopping malls in the U.S. state of California. The largest malls, with a gross leasable area of at least , are highlighted, with a ranking number based on size and date.

Super-regional enclosed malls 
 Antelope Valley Mall – Palmdale – (1990)
 Arden Fair – Sacramento – (1957)
 Beverly Center – Los Angeles – (1982)
 Brea Mall – Brea – (1977)
 (2) Del Amo Fashion Center – Torrance –  – (1961)
 Fashion Fair – Fresno – (1970)
 Galleria at Tyler – Riverside – (1970)
(6) Glendale Galleria – Glendale –  – (1976)
 Hillsdale Shopping Center – San Mateo – (1954)
 Inland Center – San Bernardino – (1966)
(4) Lakewood Center – Lakewood –  – (1951)
 Los Cerritos Center – Cerritos – (1971)
 MainPlace Mall – Santa Ana – (1987)
 Montclair Plaza – Montclair – (1968)
 Moreno Valley Mall – Moreno Valley – (1992)
 NewPark Mall – Newark – (1980)
 Northridge Fashion Center – Northridge – (1971)
 The Oaks – Thousand Oaks – (1978)
 Pacific View Mall – Ventura – (1964)
 Promenade Temecula – Temecula – (1999)
 Santa Rosa Plaza – Santa Rosa – (1983)
 The Shoppes at Carlsbad – Carlsbad – (1969)
 The Shops at Mission Viejo – Mission Viejo – (1979)
 The Shops at Montebello – Montebello – (1985)
 Solano Town Center – Fairfield – (1981)
 (1) South Coast Plaza – Costa Mesa –  – (1967)
 Stoneridge Shopping Center – Pleasanton – (1980)
 Stonestown Galleria – San Francisco – (1952)
 Stonewood Center – Downey – (1958)
 Sunvalley Shopping Center – Concord – (1967)
 Valley Plaza Mall – Bakersfield – (1967)
 Vintage Faire Mall – Modesto – (1977)
 Westfield Culver City – Culver City – (1977)
 Westfield Fashion Square – Sherman Oaks – (1962)
(11) Westfield Galleria at Roseville – Roseville –  – (2000)
 Westfield North County – Escondido – (1986)
 Westfield Oakridge – San Jose – (1971)
 Westfield Palm Desert – Palm Desert – (1982)
 Westfield Plaza Bonita – National City – (1981)
(8) Westfield San Francisco Centre – San Francisco –  – (1988)
 Westfield Santa Anita – Arcadia – (1974)
(7) Westfield Topanga – Canoga Park –  – (1964)
 Westfield Valencia Town Center – Santa Clarita – (1992)
(3) Westfield Valley Fair – San Jose –  – (1986)

Lifestyle centers / Outdoor shopping centers 
 2nd & PCH - Long Beach – (2019)
 Anaheim GardenWalk – Anaheim – (2008)
 Blackhawk Plaza – Danville – (1989)
 Broadway Plaza – Walnut Creek – (1951)
 Chula Vista Center – Chula Vista – (1962)
 City Center Bishop Ranch – San Ramon – (2018)
 The Commons at Calabasas – Calabasas – (1998)
 Del Monte Center – Monterey – (1967)
 Downtown Commons – Sacramento – (1971)
 Downtown Disney – Anaheim – (2001)
 Fashion Island – Newport Beach – (1961)
 (5) Fashion Valley – San Diego –  – (1969)
 FIGat7th – Los Angeles – (1986)
 Fig Garden Village – Fresno – (1962)
 The Forum at Carlsbad – Carlsbad – (2003)
 The Fountains at Roseville – Roseville – (2008)
 The Gardens on El Paseo – Palm Desert – (1998)
 Ghirardelli Square – San Francisco – (1893)
 Grossmont Center – La Mesa – (1961)
 The Grove at Farmers Market – Los Angeles – (2002)
 Irvine Spectrum Center – Irvine – (1995)
 La Cumbre Plaza – Santa Barbara – (1967)
 Malibu Country Mart – Malibu – (1975)
 Malibu Lumber Yard – Malibu – (2009)
 Marin Country Mart – Larkspur – (1975)
 Mill Valley Lumber Yard – Mill Valley – (2018)
 One Paseo – San Diego – (2019)
 Otay Ranch Town Center – Chula Vista – (2006)
 Pacific City – Huntington Beach – (2015)
 The Palladio at Broadstone – Folsom – (2008)
 The Paseo – Pasadena – (1980)
 Paseo Nuevo – Santa Barbara – (1990)
 PLATFORM – Culver City – (2016)
 Plaza El Segundo – El Segundo – (2006)
 The Point – El Segundo – (2015)
 The Promenade at Westlake – Westlake Village – (1997)
 Promenade on the Peninsula – Rolling Hills Estates – (1981)
 Riviera Village – Redondo Beach – (1961)
 The Runway – Playa Vista – (2015)
 The River at Rancho Mirage – Rancho Mirage – (2001)
 Triangle Square – Costa Mesa – (1992)
 Santa Monica Place – Santa Monica – (1980)
 The Shops at River Park – Fresno – (1996)
 The Shops at Sportsman's Lodge – Studio City – (2022)
 Simi Valley Town Center – Simi Valley – (2005)
 (10) Stanford Shopping Center – Palo Alto –  – (1955)
 Town Center at Corte Madera – Corte Madera – (1958)
 The Village at Corte Madera – Corte Madera – (1985)
 Westfield Century City – Los Angeles – (1964)
 Westfield Mission Valley – San Diego – (1961)
 Westfield UTC – San Diego – (1977)

Mixed-use developments 
 The Americana at Brand – Glendale
 Bay Street Emeryville – Emeryville
 Bella Terra – Huntington Beach
 The Collection at RiverPark – Oxnard
 Hollywood and Highland – Los Angeles
 The District at Tustin Legacy – Tustin
 Platform – Culver City
 Marina Pacifica – Long Beach
 Santana Row – San Jose
 Sherman Oaks Galleria – Sherman Oaks
 Universal CityWalk – Universal City
 Victoria Gardens – Rancho Cucamonga

Regional enclosed malls 
 Baldwin Hills Crenshaw Plaza – Los Angeles
 Bayfair Center – San Leandro
 Bayshore Mall – Eureka
 Buena Park Downtown – Buena Park
 Burbank Town Center – Burbank
 Capitola Mall – Capitola
 Chico Mall – Chico
 Coddingtown Mall – Santa Rosa
 Crocker Galleria – San Francisco
 Eagle Rock Plaza – Eagle Rock
 Eastridge Center – San Jose
 Embarcadero Center – San Francisco, California
 Hanford Mall – Hanford
 Imperial Valley Mall – El Centro
 Manhattan Village – Manhattan Beach
 The Mall of Victor Valley – Victorville
 Metreon – San Francisco
 Mt. Shasta Mall – Redding
 Northgate Mall – San Rafael
 Northridge Mall – Salinas
 NorthPoint Centre – San Francisco
 Parkway Plaza – El Cajon
 Plaza West Covina – West Covina
 Puente Hills Mall – Industry
 Santa Maria Town Center – Santa Maria
 Serramonte Center – Daly City
 Sherwood Mall – Stockton
 The Shops at Tanforan – San Bruno
 Somersville Towne Center – Antioch
 SouthBay Pavilion – Carson
 South Bay Galleria – Redondo Beach
 Southland Mall – Hayward
 Sunrise Mall – Citrus Heights
 The Village at Orange – Orange
 Visalia Mall – Visalia
 Weberstown Mall – Stockton
 West Hollywood Gateway – West Hollywood
 West Valley Mall – Tracy
 Westgate Mall – San Jose
 Westminster Mall – Westminster
 Yuba Sutter Mall – Yuba City

Outlet malls 
 Camarillo Premium Outlets – Camarillo
 Citadel Outlets – Commerce
 Desert Hills Premium Outlets – Cabazon
 Folsom Premium Outlets – Folsom
 Gran Plaza Outlets – Calexico
 Gilroy Premium Outlets – Gilroy
(9) Great Mall of the Bay Area – Milpitas – 
 Las Americas Outlets – San Ysidro
 Ontario Mills – Ontario
 Outlets at San Clemente – San Clemente
 The Outlets at Orange – Orange
 The Outlets at Tejon – Wheeler Ridge
 The Pike Outlets – Long Beach
 Petaluma Village Premium Outlets – Petaluma
 San Francisco Premium Outlets – Livermore
 Vacaville Premium Outlets – Vacaville
 The Shoppes at Chino Hills – Chino Hills
 Shasta Gateway – Anderson

Power centers / Outside strip centers 
 8000 Sunset Strip – Los Angeles
 Alameda South Shore Center – Alameda
 Anaheim Plaza – Anaheim
 Beverly Connection – Beverly Grove, Los Angeles
College Grove Shopping Center – Lemon Grove
 Eastland Center – West Covina
 Eastvale Gateway – Eastvale
 El Cerrito Plaza – El Cerrito
 Encino Place – Encino
 Fremont Hub Shopping Center – Fremont
 La Habra Market Place
 La Jolla Village Square – La Jolla
 Long Beach Towne Center – Long Beach – 
 Los Altos Center – Long Beach
 Peninsula Shopping Center – Rolling Hills Estates
 Plaza De La Cañada Shopping Center - La Cañada Flintridge
 Macdonald 80 Shopping Center – Richmond
 Mira Mesa Mall – Mira Mesa
 Pacific Commons – Fremont
 Panorama Mall – Panorama City (enclosed power center)
 Palo Cedro Shopping Center – Palo Cedro
 Paraiso Town Center – Thousand Oaks
 Park Plaza Shopping Center – San Pedro
 Plaza Mayor Shopping Center – Torrance
 Point Dume Plaza Shopping Center – Malibu
 Princeton Plaza Mall – San Jose
 Pruneyard Shopping Center – Campbell
 The Quad at Whittier – Whittier
 Westlake Shopping Center – Daly City
 Whittwood Town Center – Whittier
 The Willows Shopping Center – Concord
 Gower Gulch Plaza – Los Angeles, California
 One Westside Shopping Center – Los Angeles, California

Notable small shopping centers
 ARCO Plaza – Downtown Los Angeles
 Los Angeles Mall – Civic Center, Los Angeles

Dead malls 
Abandoned or nearly-unoccupied former malls in this state of California.
 6x6 – San Francisco
 Barstow Mall – Barstow
 Country Club Plaza – Sacramento
 Indio Fashion Mall (now Indio Grand Marketplace) – Indio
 Manchester Center – Fresno
 Sequoia Mall – Visalia
 The Shops at Hilltop – Richmond
 Westgate Center – San Leandro

Demolished / Closed malls 
 Desert Fashion Plaza – Palm Springs (October 1967 – 2001; demolished in 2013)
 Carousel Mall – San Bernardino (October 11, 1972 – August 22, 2017) 
 East Hills Mall – Bakersfield 
 Eureka Mall – Eureka
 Fallbrook Center – West Hills – (November 12, 1963 – 1997)
 Hawthorne Plaza – Hawthorne – (1977–1999)
 Horton Plaza – San Diego – (August 9, 1985 – 2019)
 Laguna Hills Mall – Laguna Hills – (April 1973 – December 31, 2018)
 Laurel Plaza – North Hollywood
 La Mirada Mall – La Mirada 
 La Habra Market Place – La Habra – (1969–1994)
 Mountain Gate Plaza – Simi Valley
 Long Beach Plaza – Long Beach
 Palm Springs Mall – Palms Springs
 Redlands Mall – Redlands – (1977–2011)
 Sunnyvale Town Center – Sunnyvale – (1979–2018)
 Vallco Shopping Mall – Cupertino – (1976–2020)
 Valley Plaza – North Hollywood – most elements abandoned or demolished, some remain
 Westfield Promenade – Woodland Hills (March 1973 – present)
 Westside Pavilion – West Los Angeles (1985–2019)

There are many more malls throughout the state of California.

See also
List of shopping malls in the United States

References

California

Shopping malls